The 1941 Montana State Bobcats football team was an American football team that represented Montana State College (later renamed Montana State University) in the Rocky Mountain Conference (RMC) during the 1941 college football season. In its 12th and final season under head coach Schubert R. Dyche, the team compiled a 1–4–2 record (1–2–1 against RMC opponents). Brick Breeden was assistant coach. Carl Fjeld was the frosh coach.

Schedule

References

Montana State
Montana State Bobcats football seasons
Montana State Bobcats football